DreamAhead College Investment Plan is a higher education savings program administered by the State of Washington. The plan was created in 2016 by the Washington State Legislature, and statutorily known as the Washington College Savings Plan (RCW 28B.95.032), and opened for nationwide participation in 2018. It is one of two 529 programs offered by the state, the other being the Guaranteed Education Tuition Program (known as GET), which is a prepaid program. The programs are supported by Washington College Savings Plans (WA529), a division of Washington Student Achievement Council.

Plan administration 
DreamAhead is administered by the Committee on Advanced Tuition Payment and College Savings. Sumday Administration, an affiliate of Bank of New York Mellon, is the plan's Program Manager. Investment advisory services are provided by Lockwood Advisors.

Investment choices 
A DreamAhead account can be opened with as little as $25. Once opened, contributions to a DreamAhead account can be made by check, Automatic Investment Plan (AIP), Electronic Funds Transfer (EFT), Payroll Direct Deposit, Gift Contribution, Rollover from another 529 account, Re-contribution of a refunded distribution, or by moving assets from a child savings or education savings account.

Participants in DreamAhead can choose between two types of investment options: a Year of Enrollment portfolio, in which the investment allocation is automatically adjusted over time based on the beneficiary's expected year of college enrollment; or a Static Portfolio, in which the account owner can choose a specific investment mix based on their risk tolerance.

Accolades 
In 2020, DreamAhead College Investment Plan was awarded a Bronze Medal by Morningstar, the first time DreamAhead had achieved a Morningstar rating since its inception. In its announcement naming DreamAhead among "The Top 529 College Savings Plans of 2020", Morningstar stated, "Washington's plan has been on our radar since its launch in 2018, and a deeper dive into the construction of its three risk-based target enrollment suites gave us confidence that the plan will serve Washingtonians well."

References 

Investment
Finance